Ballads 1 (stylized in all caps) is the debut studio album by Japanese singer-songwriter Joji. It serves as a follow-up to In Tongues EP, his first project as Joji, and Pink Season, his only album released under the now-retired alter-ego Pink Guy. It was released on 26 October 2018 through 88rising and 12Tone Music. The album debuted at number three on the US Billboard 200 as well as number one on the US Top R&B/Hip-Hop Albums chart. The album was certified platinum by the RIAA in October 2021.

Composition and writing 
Ballads 1 is primarily produced by Joji himself and features only one vocal feature, with Trippie Redd appearing on "R.I.P." though features production features from names such as Clams Casino, D33J and Shlohmo. The project is introspective, writing about the "reality of love, life and everything in between." The project ranges from songs that are "heart-wrenching" and sometimes more cheerful to capture the feeling that "no one's sad all the time".

The focus of the project is ballads, according to Joji; and in an interview with Annie Mac said that he was trying to make the project full of ballads that are different in their "own special way" and that are powerful, set a new direction but keep "Joji roots" he established on In Tongues.

Joji stated in an interview with Triple J how he wanted to take a more pop-oriented approach to his style on the album, which began with the single "Yeah Right".

Release and promotion
Ballads 1 was announced on 12 September 2018 alongside the release of the album's second single "Slow Dancing in the Dark". An accompanying music video directed by Jared Hogan was released the same day. The lead single, "Yeah Right" had been released on 8 May 2018. It was released with a music video and was produced by Joji.

"Can't Get Over You" was released on 2 October 2018 with an accompanying video directed by Miller and SAINT. The album's release date, cover artwork and track listing were revealed the same day.

"Test Drive" was released on 16 October 2018 with an accompanying video directed by James Defina.

A music video for "Wanted U" was released on 29 October 2018, directed by Michael La Burt.

Commercial performance 
Ballads 1 debuted at number 3 on the Billboard 200, with 57,000 album-equivalent units. The album has since been certified gold as of 16 January 2020.

Critical reception

Braudie Blais-Billie from Pitchfork stated "Joji's first full-length project features a host of guests in a quality effort to help push past the confines of his bedroom walls and tedious heartache", going on to write "The ballad is a great mode for Joji. It retains the tormented intimacy of his music while elevating his approach to a more radio-friendly consistency than the runny compositions of In Tongues", giving the album a 6.7/10. Elias Leight from Rolling Stone gave the project 3 out of 5 stars, complimenting the progression from the In Tongues EP, the change of musical style throughout the project and the ability to produce "a particular kind of self-deprecating pop."

Rap and R&B blogs, the two genres which are the primary demographic of Miller, gave the project positive reviews. Highsnobiety gave the project 3/5 stars, calling it a "near-classic" with "on-point production" and complimenting Miller's progression. HotNewHipHop gave the project a "Very Hot" rating, calling the project "smooth." RIFF magazine complimented Miller's attempt to expand on his potential and spoke on its "array of soundscapes."

Track listing

Personnel
Credits adapted from Tidal.

Technical
 Henry Laufer – mixing , recording 
 Francisco "Frankie" Ramirez – mixing , recording , mastering 
 Alison McGuire – mixing , recording 
 George Miller – recording 
 John Durham –  recording 
 Igor Mamet – recording 
 Chris Athens – mastering 
 Jenna Felsenthal – assistant 
 Emmanuel "Yizzo" Lemmon – assistant 

Musicians
 Patrick Wimberly – additional vocals

Charts

Weekly charts

Year-end charts

Certifications

References

2018 debut albums
88rising albums
Albums produced by D33J
Albums produced by Ryan Hemsworth
Albums produced by Jam City
Albums produced by Thundercat (musician)
Albums produced by Patrick Wimberly
Joji (musician) albums
Pop albums by Japanese artists
Trap music albums
Downtempo albums